The sixth season of Deutschland sucht den Superstar was aired on German channel RTL from January to May 2009. The season's winner, Daniel Schuhmacher, was awarded a contract with Sony BMG. The judges in this season were Dieter Bohlen, Nina Eichinger, and Volker Neumüller. It was hosted by Marco Schreyl. The viewers chose the contestant's fates as they were able to call for their favorite contestant.
As with season 5, the "Top 10" was created by the Top 5 contestants with the most telephone and SMS voting and the other five were selected by the jury.

Finalists
(Ages stated at time of contest)

Voting controversy
Annemarie Eilfeld demanded a redo after she was eliminated in the Top 3 show. RTL admitted that a speaker in the "reminder" trailers following the show had told viewers to vote 03 for Eilfeld and 02 for Daniel Schuhmacher. She called this problem a "scandal". The mistake was not considered big enough for RTL to bother with. After the initial show, Eilfeld had 19.3% of the vote and ended up with 19.8% with the second place contestant receiving a much higher total. Angry DSDS fans complained and demanded either a repeat of the Top 3 show or a three-way final between Eilfeld, Schuhmacher and Sarah Kreuz. Eilfeld's father was outraged over the error and reportedly considering taking legal action against RTL.

Top 15 – "Jetzt oder nie" (Top 15 - Now or Never) 
Original airdate: 28 February 2009

Advancing to Top 10 (Public votes): Vanessa N, Daniel, Sarah, Dominik, Holger

Advancing to Top 10 (Jury selection): Marc, Annemarie, Cornelia, Vanessa C, Benny

Although Florian and Tobias were eliminated, they both ranked within the top 10 in the phone voting with Florian placing 9th and Tobias placing 7th, ahead of Marc, Benny, Vanessa C., and Cornelia.

Finals

Top 10 - "Greatest Hits"
Original airdate: 7 March 2009

Bottom 4: Marc Jentzen, Benny Kieckhäben, Michelle Bowers, Annemarie Eilfeld 

Jury Elimination Forecast: Benny Kieckhäben 

Eliminated: Michelle Bowers

Top 9 - "Geschlechtertausch" (Gender Switch)
Original airdate: 14 March 2009

Bottom 4: Marc Jentzen, Cornelia Patzlsperger, Benny Kieckhäben, Annemarie Eilfeld 

Jury Elimination Forecast: Benny Kieckhäben 

Eliminated: Cornelia Patzlsperger

Top 8 - "Party Hits"
Original airdate: 21 March 2009

Bottom 4: Benny Kieckhäben, Marc Jentzen, Vanessa Neigert, Annemarie Eilfeld 

Jury Elimination Forecast: Annemarie Eilfeld 

Eliminated: Marc Jentzen

Top 7 - "Sexy Hits"
Original airdate: 4 April 2009

Bottom 4: Benny Kieckhäben, Holger Göpfert, Vanessa Neigert, Annemarie Eilfeld

Jury Elimination Forecast: Dominik Büchele (Nina), Annemarie Eilfeld (Volker & Dieter) 

Eliminated: Holger Göpfert

Top 6 - "Aktuelle Hits & I Love You" (Current Hits & I Love You)
Original airdate: 11 April 2009

Bottom 4: Annemarie Eilfeld, Benny Kieckhäben, Daniel Schuhmacher, Vanessa Neigert 

Jury Elimination Forecast: Benny Kieckhäben (Volker), Benny Kieckhäben or Vanessa Neigert (Nina), Didn't say (Dieter) 

Eliminated: Vanessa Neigert

Top 5 - "Sonne und Regen" (Sun and Rain)
Original airdate: 18 April 2009

Bottom 3: Annemarie Eilfeld, Benny Kieckhäben, Sarah Kreuz 

Jury Elimination Forecast: Annemarie Eilfeld (Nina), Dominik Büchele (Volker), Benny Kieckhäben (Dieter) 

Eliminated: Benny Kieckhäben

Top 4 - "Filmmusik & Unplugged" (Movie songs & Unplugged)
Original airdate: 25 April 2009

Bottom 3: Annemarie Eilfeld, Dominik Büchele, Sarah Kreuz 

Jury Elimination Forecast: Dominik Büchele (Nina & Volker), Sarah Kreuz (Dieter) 

Eliminated: Dominik Büchele

Top 3 - "Uptempo, Ballade & Nr. 1 Hit" (Uptempo, Power ballad & No. 1 Hits)
Original airdate: 2 May 2009

Bottom 2: Annemarie Eilfeld, Sarah Kreuz 

Jury Elimination Forecast: Didn't say 

Eliminated: Annemarie Eilfeld

Top 2 - Finale - "Herzenssong", "Staffelhighlight", "Siegertitel" (Singer's choice, Highlight Song, Winner's Single)
Original airdate: 9 May 2009

Judges' forecasts of who would win: Daniel or Sarah (Nina, Volker & Dieter)

 Winner: Daniel Schuhmacher

 Runner - Up: Sarah Kreuz

Top 10 contestants

Michelle Bowers

Michelle Bowers (born 6 August 1992 in Frankfurt am Main) was the youngest participant in the Top 10. She was originally eliminated in the "Top 15" show when both the viewers and jury did not put her into the next round. However one day before the first theme show, contestant Vanessa Civiello quit the competition bringing Bowers back into the Top 10. Although with only one night of rehearsal, the judges praised her comeback and believed it would allow her to go further in the competition. However, she was eliminated.

Dominik Büchele
Dominik Büchele (born 23 February 1991 in Herbolzheim) has been voted off the competition after theme show 7, finishing in the Top 4. He was known for his comparison and looks of James Blunt. He was a fan favorite among the girls.

Audition: "Same Mistake" - James Blunt
Recall 1: "I'm Yours" - Jason Mraz
Recall 2: "You Give Me Something" - James Morrison
Recall 3: "Goodbye My Lover" - James Blunt

Vanessa Civiello
Vanessa Civiello (born 7 May 1991 in Stuttgart) was a jury selection for Top 10 after participating in the Top 15 liveshow. One day before the first theme show, Civiello voluntarily withdrew. Michelle Bowers was recalled to replace Civiello.

Annemarie Eilfeld

Holger Göpfert
Holger Göpfert (born 13 May 1981 in Würzburg) worked as an administration employee in Würzburg and is a soccer player. He auditioned in season 3 but did not make it through to the recall. At 13, Holger began to teach himself keyboard and to sing pass after songs. He also taught himself to play piano and guitar. He is a huge fan of the Beatles, Queen and Elvis in which he had sung songs in the show by these artists. His favorite song is "Oh Darling!" by the Beatles, in which he sang on the "Top 15" show and was selected further by call in votes. He was a fan favorite due to his excellent performing and entertainment rather than his voice. Although considered a joke contestant, he was well known for being a favorite and possible winner of the competition until his elimination.

Audition: "Oh Darling" - The Beatles
Recall 1: "The Great Pretender" - Freddie Mercury
Recall 2: "Love Ain't Here Anymore" - Take That & "Still Got the Blues"- Gary Moore
Recall 3: "Lady Madonna - The Beatles

Marc Jentzen
Marc Jentzen (born 21 August 1987 in Bonn) taught at Star Camp after his elimination.

Benny Kieckhäben
Benny Kieckhäben (born 11 February 1990) is known for his unexpected audition due to way he looked. He was put through by all three judges after singing "If I Ever Fall in Love". Since, he has become somewhat of a favorite in the competition, although has been in the bottom every week, due to his good-sounding voice and his use of props (such as a cage in his performance of "Don't Cha"). He is openly gay. Throughout the competition, he was known to sing songs by female artists.

Audition: "If I Ever Fall in Love" - Shai
Recall 1: "And I Am Telling You I'm Not Going" - Jennifer Holliday
Recall 2: N/A
Recall 3: "End of the Road" - Boyz II Men

Sarah Kreuz
Sarah Kreuz (born 27 July 1989 in Bergheim) lives in Poppenhausen near Schweinfurt. She has consistent high placings in the show and has been a contest winner.

Vanessa Neigert
Vanessa Neigert (born 11 July 1992 in Tevillo, Italy)

Cornelia Patzlsperger
Cornelia Patzlsperger (born 16 July 1979 in Bad Tölz)

Daniel Schuhmacher

Daniel Schuhmacher (born 19 April 1987 in Pfullendorf) is the season 6 winner of Deutschland sucht den Superstar.

Elimination chart

References

Season 06
2009 German television seasons
2009 in German music